Anthony Darius Blaylock (born February 21, 1965) is a former professional American football cornerback in the National Football League (NFL). He played six seasons for the Cleveland Browns, the San Diego Chargers, and the Chicago Bears.

References

1965 births
Living people
Players of American football from Raleigh, North Carolina
American football cornerbacks
Winston-Salem State Rams football players
Cleveland Browns players
San Diego Chargers players
Chicago Bears players